The Convention of 1961 Concerning the Powers of Authorities and the Law Applicable in Respect of the Protection of Infants, or Hague Protection of Minors Convention is a multilateral convention of the Hague Conference on Private International Law. The 1961 Convention emphasized the concept of the "interests of the child" as a basis for authorities of the child's nationality to overrule the authorities of the child's habitual residence. It built upon prior efforts to create successful multilateral treaties and brought an innovation in terminology by creating a compromise between advocates of "nationality" as the determining factor for jurisdiction and advocates for the modern fact-centric model of "habitual residence." The convention also included expanded language to encompass both judicial and administrative authorities in response to the Boll case (regarding the Hague Convention of 1902 relating to the settlement of guardianship of minors). Of particularly special note, the drafters of the 1961 Convention expressly considered a provision addressing the removal of a child from their habitual residence with an intent to evade rightful jurisdiction—primarily for child custody reasons. This first attempt to codify international child abduction failed due to an inability to agree on a definition or manner of describing the phenomenon, with a number of countries that adhered to the principle of nationality regulating personal child and family law unable to classify their nationals removing children from foreign countries to their home state as illegal.

Contracting States
As of 2013, 14 states are parties to the convention, of which 13 are located in Europe. 

 (only Macao)

	

	

 (including Aruba, Curaçao, Sint Maarten and the Caribbean Netherlands)

References

External links
 Full Convention text
 Convention status table

Hague Conference on Private International Law conventions
Treaties concluded in 1961
Treaties entered into force in 1969
Treaties of Austria
Treaties extended to Portuguese Macau
Treaties of France
Treaties of West Germany
Treaties of Italy
Treaties of Latvia
Treaties of Lithuania
Treaties of Luxembourg
Treaties of the Netherlands
Treaties of Poland
Treaties of the Estado Novo (Portugal)
Treaties of Spain
Treaties of Switzerland
Treaties of Turkey
Family law treaties
Child custody
1961 in the Netherlands
Treaties extended to the Netherlands Antilles
Treaties extended to Aruba
Treaties of Yugoslavia